Copper arsenate (Cu3(AsO4)2·4H2O, or Cu5H2(AsO4)4·2H2O), also called copper orthoarsenate, tricopper arsenate, cupric arsenate, or tricopper orthoarsenate, is a blue or bluish-green powder insoluble in water and alcohol and soluble in aqueous ammonium and dilute acids.

Uses
Copper arsenate is an insecticide used in agriculture. It is also used as a herbicide, fungicide, and a rodenticide. It is also used as a poison in slug baits.

Copper arsenate can also be a misnomer for copper arsenite, especially when meant as a pigment.

Natural occurrences
Anhydrous copper arsenate, Cu3(AsO4)2, is found in nature as the mineral lammerite. Copper arsenate tetrahydrate, Cu3(AsO4)2·4H2O, occurs naturally as the mineral rollandite.

Related compounds
Copper arsenate hydroxide or basic copper arsenate (Cu(OH)AsO4) is a basic variant with CAS number . It is found naturally as the mineral olivenite. It is used as an insecticide, fungicide, and miticide. Its use is banned in Thailand since 2001.

See also
Lead arsenate
Calcium arsenate
Paris Green (copper acetoarsenite)
Chromated copper arsenate
Scheele's Green (copper arsenite)

References

External links

National Pollutant Inventory - Copper and compounds fact sheet

Arsenates
Copper(II) compounds
Inorganic insecticides
Arsenical herbicides
Rodenticides
Fungicides